The House of Salviati was a prominent and old noble family in the Republic of Florence. Members of the family frequently occupied many important public positions. They held the title of Duke of Giuliano and Duke Salviati.

History 
Some sources would trace the Salviati family back to a progenitor named Gottifredo who lived in the 12th century , but the first historically ascertained figure member of the family was Cambio di Salvi, who occupied both positions of gonfalonieri and priori. After him, there were twenty Salviati members who were gonfalonieri and sixty-two who occupied the position of priori.

Notable members 
 Francesco Salviati, archbishop of Pisa, hanged from the walls of the Palazzo della Signoria in 1478 for his part in the Pazzi Conspiracy 
 Jacopo Salviati (1461–1533), married Lucrezia de' Medici 
 Giovanni Salviati (1490–1553), cardinal
 Maria Salviati (1499–1543), daughter of Lucrezia di Medici and Jacopo Salviati, married Giovanni delle Bande Nere, mother of Cosimo I de Medici.
 Bernardo Salviati (1508–1568), condottiere, general of the galleys of the Order of St. John of Jerusalem and cardinal
 Cassandre Salviati, daughter of Bernardo Salviati, dedicatee of the Amours de Cassandre of Pierre de Ronsard
 Diane Salviati, niece of Cassandre, dedicatee of the  L’hécatombe à Diane of Agrippa d'Aubigné 
 Antonio Maria Salviati (1537–1602), appointed cardinal in 1583
 Alamanno Salviati, cardinal from 1727 until his death in 1733
 Gregorio Salviati, cardinal from 1777, died 1794

References

 
Italian noble families
Banking families